Diana Rivers (born October 17, 1931) is an American writer, artist, and activist. She is the author of the Hadra book series and recognized as a pioneer of women-only spaces in Arkansas. Rivers is an advocate for LGBT rights, peace, racial equality, social justice, and ecology.

Early life and education 
Diana Duer Smith was born on October 17, 1931 in New York City to Schuyler Knowlton Smith and Elizabeth Larocque. Rivers was raised near Morristown, New Jersey. Her parents separated before she was three and her mother married Lewis Rutherfurd Stuyvesant, son of Rutherfurd Stuyvesant in 1934. Rivers' mother was a writer and poet who published a book, Satan's Shadow, in 1930. She was the daughter of Joseph Larocque. Rivers' father married Penelope Pelham Pattee in 1954. Rivers' maternal great aunts were writers Caroline King Duer and Alice Duer Miller. Rivers' maternal grandmother, Eleanor Duer Larocque, an artist, was influential in her life and helped introduce her to sculptor William Zorach, whom Rivers' studied under and lived with his family in Maine for several summers while she was a teenager. Rivers' attended Cooper Union in the early 1950s.

Career 
In 1970, Rivers went on a solo camping trip out west to create a new community. She spent time in various communes in New Mexico, Oregon, and California including Hog Farm. She established the Sassafras community, a women-only space in Boxley Valley. While there, she changed her surname to Rivers to recognize her new life. Her vision was to start an intentional community focused on living sustainable off of the land. Rivers build a cabin and wrote short stories about her experiences at Sassafras. She wrote her first novel here. In 1980, Rivers moved to Fayetteville, Arkansas and created the Ozark Land Holding Association with 19 other women. It consists of 280 acres.

Rivers is the author of the Hadra book series. She published the first novel, Journey to Zelindar, in 1987. The series is about women with powers and mind reading abilities. From 1991 to 1993, Rivers was an organizer of the WomenVision month-long arts and performance show hosted in Kansas City, Missouri and Eureka Springs, Arkansas. She also started the MatriArts arts and performance venue which lasted for three years in Fayetteville. From 1990 to 1999, Rivers organized the University of Arkansas Women's Conference and Festival where she served as the art show curator. In 1999, she received the Wise Woman Award at the conference. Rivers is a cement sculptor. She was a script writer for Goddess Productions, a theatre group in Fayetteville.

She published The Red Line of Yarmald in 2003 which was nominated for a Lambda Literary Award for science fiction, fantasy and horror. In 2005, the OMNI Center for Peace, Justice and Ecology recognized Rivers as an Arkansas Peace and Justice Hero. Rivers founded the Goddess Festival in Fayetteville in 2008. It is a week-long event held annually in March. In 2012, she won the Golden Crown Literary Award in speculative fiction for the novel, The Smuggler, the Spy and the Spider. Rivers was included in The Book of Pride.

Personal life 
In the early 1950s, Rivers married artist Robert Folley. The two embarked on a European trip to study art. Their first son was born in Paris, after which they traveled by motorcycle through France, Italy, and Greece before returning to New York City where they had their second son. Rivers had her third son in West Nyack, New York before moving to Gate Hill Cooperative in Stony Point, New York. Rivers' divorced Folley in 1970. She is a Pagan, lesbian, and feminist who actively supports gay rights, peace, racial equality, social justice, and ecology. Rivers protested the Vietnam War and the Iraq War.

Selected works

References

1931 births
Living people
20th-century American women writers
20th-century American women artists
Writers from New York City
21st-century American women artists
21st-century American women writers
American lesbian writers
LGBT people from New York (state)
LGBT people from New Jersey
LGBT people from Arkansas
People from Morris County, New Jersey
Writers from New Jersey
Writers from Arkansas
Activists from New York City
Activists from New Jersey
Activists from Arkansas
American anti–Vietnam War activists
American anti–Iraq War activists
American social justice activists
American LGBT rights activists
American women environmentalists
American environmentalists
American modern pagans
American feminist writers
Lesbian feminists
People from Fayetteville, Arkansas
American lesbian artists